Red-backed voles are small, slender voles of the genus Clethrionomys found in North America, Europe, and Asia. In recent years the genus name was changed to Myodes, however a 2019 paper found that Myodes was actually a junior synonym for Lemmus, thus making it unusable. As such, Clethrionomys is re-established as the proper genus name.

Red-backed voles inhabit northern forests, tundra and bogs. They feed on shrubs, berries and roots. Most species have reddish brown fur on their back. They have small eyes and ears. Unlike other voles, the molar teeth are rooted in adults.

The complete list of species is:
Japanese red-backed vole, Clethrionomys andersoni
Western red-backed vole, Clethrionomys californicus
Tien Shan red-backed vole, Clethrionomys  centralis
Southern red-backed vole, Clethrionomys gapperi
Bank vole, Clethrionomys glareolus
Imaizumi's red-backed vole, Clethrionomys imaizumii
Korean red-backed vole, Clethrionomys regulus
Hokkaido red-backed vole, Clethrionomys rex
Grey red-backed vole, Clethrionomys rufocanus
Northern red-backed vole, Clethrionomys rutilus
Shansei vole, Clethrionomys shanseius
Smith's vole, Clethrionomys smithii

References

External links

Myodes
Extant Piacenzian first appearances